The 1893 Colgate football team represented Colgate University in the 1893 college football season. Colgate reports the record for the season as 3–0–1, however, there was a previously unreported game against Hamilton that ended in dispute. The Hamilton team left the field in the second half over a dispute about eligible players.

Schedule

References

Colgate
Colgate Raiders football seasons
College football undefeated seasons
Colgate football